Prenylcysteine oxidase 1 is an enzyme that in humans is encoded by the PCYOX1 gene.

See also
 Prenylcysteine oxidase

References

Further reading